The business known as Toyota Financial Services covers more than 30 countries and regions, including Japan. Financial services operations are coordinated by a wholly owned subsidiary of Toyota Motor Corporation (TMC), Toyota Financial Services Corporation (TFSC), which has overall responsibility for the financial services subsidiaries globally.

The first TFS operation commenced in Sydney, Australia, in 1982 as Toyota Finance Australia Limited and was soon followed by operations in the United States, Canada, Europe, Asia and Oceania.

TFS has constructed a global network that covers approximately 90% of the markets in which Toyota sells its vehicles. Mainly concentrated on auto loans, leases and Toyota dealer floorplan requirements, TFS provides auto sales financing to approximately 11.6 million customers, globally. Toyota Financial Service Corporation via its U.S. subsidiary "Toyota Motor Credit Corporation" owns Toyota Financial Savings Bank, an ILC chartered bank in Henderson, NV.

TFS offers its customers financial services that include auto sales financing, credit cards, retail sales of corporate bonds and investment trusts, and insurance.

TFS around the world

Kazakhstan 
In Kazakhstan, as of July 2021, the company ranks second in terms of assets among microfinance organizations in the country.

References

External links 

 

Financial services companies established in 1982
Financial services companies of Japan
Toyota Group